Miss Malaysia World 2015, the 49th edition of Miss World Malaysia was held at the Corus Hotel, Kuala Lumpur on August 29, 2015. Dewi Liana Seriestha of Sarawak crowned her successor, Brynn Zalina Lovett from Sabah at the end of the event. The main sponsors for the event was Metrojaya and Corus Hotel while the exclusive sponsor was Wacoal Malaysia.

Twenty contestants from different states competed for the crown. Brynn represented Malaysia at Miss World 2015 held in Sanya, China where she got first runner-up for Miss World Talent, Top 10 in Multimedia Award and Top 12 Dances of the World.

Results

Special awards

Contestants 
20 contestants competed for the crown and title.

Judges 
The following served as judges on the coronation night of Miss Malaysia World 2015:

 Melinder Bhullar – Miss Malaysia World 2013
 Jovian Mandagie – Fashion designer
 Dato Julie Lim Chew Ching – House of Tatiana founder and owner
 Takashi Watanabe – Executive Director of Wacoal Malaysia
 Joyce Sit – President of Laura Ashley (Asia)

References

External links

 

Beauty pageants in Malaysia
2015 beauty pageants
2015